Charles Thomas (8 February 1864 – 8 March 1948) was a Welsh international rugby union utility player who played club rugby for Newport and invitational rugby for the Barbarians. Thomas won nine caps for Wales.

Rugby career
Thomas joined first class team Newport in 1885 and while at the club was utilised in multiple positions throughout his career. Thomas played as fly-half, scrum-half, centre, half back and wing and had a very high score rate, with 99 tries in 215 appearances for Newport. During Newport's 1891/92 invincible season, he partnered legendary Welsh captain Arthur Gould at centre.

In 1888, Thomas was selected to represent Wales for the first time in a game against Ireland as part of the 1888 Home Nations Championship. Although Wales lost the game Thomas was reselected for the very next Welsh team in a game against the touring Māoris at St Helens. Wales won the match by one goal and two tries to nil, but Thomas was on the losing team when his club side, Newport, faced the Māoris four days later.

Thomas played another seven games for his country, including all games in the 1889 tournament and 1890 tournament.  In 1890 Thomas scored his only international points, when he scored a try in a draw against Ireland at Lansdowne Road.

International matches played
Wales (rugby union)
  1890, 1891
 Ireland  1888, 1889, 1890, 1891
  1888
  1889, 1890

Bibliography

References 

1864 births
1948 deaths
Barbarian F.C. players
Newport RFC players
Rugby union fly-halves
Rugby union players from Newport, Wales
Wales international rugby union players
Welsh rugby union players